Rhus lanceolata, the prairie sumac, is a species of plant native to the south-western United States (Texas, Oklahoma, Arizona, New Mexico), and northern Mexico (Coahuila, Nuevo León and Tamaulipas).

Rhus lanceolata is a shrub or small tree up to 9 m (30 feet) tall, reproducing by means of underground rhizomes. Leaves are pinnately compound with 13-17 lanceolate leaflets and a winged rachis. Leaflets are entire (untoothed) or with small teeth, green and shiny above but whitish and pubescent below. Flowers are born in a panicle up to 14 cm (5.6 inches) tall. Flowers are white to greenish. Fruits are lens-shaped, about 6 mm (0.25 inches) across, dark red and hairy.

Uses
Birds eat the fruit during the winter, and deer forage the foliage. The tannin-containing leaves have been used to tan leather.

References

lanceolata
Trees of Northeastern Mexico
Trees of the South-Central United States
Flora of Arizona
Flora of Coahuila
Flora of New Mexico
Flora of Nuevo León
Flora of Oklahoma
Flora of Tamaulipas
Flora of Texas
Taxa named by Asa Gray
Flora without expected TNC conservation status